Santino Rocchetti (born Sante Rocchetti on 13 July 1946) is an Italian singer-songwriter and musician.

Life and career 
Born in Montalto di Castro, Viterbo, Rocchetti started his career as founder and lead member of the group "I Rokketti". After a number of experiences in other groups, he started a solo career in 1975, getting an immediate hit  with the song "Pelle di sole", which ranked #15 on the Italian hit parade. Between 1976 and 1978 he entered the competition at the Sanremo Music Festival three times, ranking sixth in 1978 with the song "Armonia e poesia".  Starting from the 1980s he focused his activities on live performances and concerts.

Discography 
 Album     
     1977: Dedicato a te (Fonit Cetra)
     1978: Santino Rocchetti (Fonit Cetra)
     1980: Santino Rocchetti (Fonit Cetra)
 
 Singles   
     1975: "Pelle di sole" (Fonit Cetra, SP 1580)
     1976: "E tu mi manchi" (Fonit Cetra, SP 1607)
     1976: "Dolcemente bambina" (Fonit Cetra, SP 1618)
     1977: "Dedicato a te" (Fonit Cetra, SP 1642)
     1977: "Amado mio" (Fonit Cetra, SP 1661)
     1978: "Armonia e poesia" (Fonit Cetra, SP 1675)
     1978: "Divina" (Fonit Cetra, SP 1691)
     1979: "Per favore Angela no" (Fonit Cetra, SP 1713)
     1980: "Macché amore" (Fonit Cetra, SP 1737)
     1982: "Rodaggio d'amore" (SIF, NP 10025)

References

External links 

 

People from the Province of Viterbo
1946 births
Italian pop singers
Italian composers
Italian male composers
Italian singer-songwriters
Living people
Italian male singers